Li Mingyuan (born 30 August 1965) is a Chinese politician and the current deputy party chief and mayor of Xi'an, capital of northwest China's Shaanxi province.

Biography
Li was born in Wuqi County, Shaanxi, in 30 August 1965. After the resumption of College Entrance Examination, he graduated from Tsinghua University and Xidian University. After university, he was assigned to the Xi'an Huanghe Electrical and Mechanical Co., Ltd. and worked there for four years. 

In June 1995 he joined the Xi'an Institute of Posts and Telecommunications as a teacher. 

In 2001, at the age of 36, he made a crossover from education to politics. In May he became deputy head of Shaanxi Provincial Information Industry Department, three years later he was appointed deputy secretary-general of Shaanxi Provincial Government. In February 2013 he was head of Shaanxi Provincial Science and Technology Department, and held that office until January 2015, when he was transferred to Weinan and appointed deputy party chief and acting mayor and then mayor there. On February 1, 2019, he was elected vice-mayor and acting mayor of Xi'an, capital of northwest China's Shaanxi province, replacing Shangguan Jiqing, who took the fall for the failed eco-environmental renovation operation of Qinling. He was installed as mayor of Xi'an on February 18.

References

External links
  Biography of Li Mingyuan on 163.com  

1965 births
Living people
Tsinghua University alumni
Xidian University alumni
People's Republic of China politicians from Shaanxi
Chinese Communist Party politicians from Shaanxi
Mayors of Xi'an